Carlo Veneziani (July 12, 1882 – January 17, 1950) was an Italian playwright and screenwriter. He wrote the comedy play The Ancestor which was later adapted into a film of the same title.

Born at Leporano in southern Italy, he died in Milan.

Selected filmography
 The Ancestor (1938)
 The Hussar Captain (1940)

References

Bibliography 
 Estavan, Lawrence & Burgess, Mary Wickizer,  The Italian Theatre in San Francisco (Wildside Press, 1991)

External links 
 

1882 births
1950 deaths
20th-century Italian screenwriters
Italian male screenwriters
People from the Province of Taranto
20th-century Italian male writers